Colin J. Schmitt (born June 20, 1990) is an American businessman and politician who served two terms as a member of the New York State Assembly from the 99th district, which covers parts of Orange and Rockland Counties. He is a member of the Republican Party.

He ran to represent New York's 18th congressional district in the 2022, losing to incumbent Democrat Pat Ryan.

Early life and education
Schmitt was born on Staten Island and raised in Orange County, New York. He graduated from Valley Central High School in Montgomery, New York.

He earned a Bachelor of Arts degree in politics with minors in theology and religious studies from the Catholic University of America.

Career 
He started his political career in the office of then-Assemblywoman Ann Rabbitt, becoming the youngest aide to ever be hired in the Assembly. After graduating from the Catholic University of America in 2012, Schmitt joined the staff of State Senator Greg Ball, and later worked as the chief of staff for the town supervisor of New Windsor.

Schmitt is also a commercial real estate agent and a corporal in the Army National Guard.

New York State Assembly
Schmitt first ran for office in 2012, campaigning for the Assembly's 99th district. He lost in the primary to Goshen Mayor Kyle Roddey, who in turn lost in the general election to Democrat James Skoufis.

Schmitt ran for the same seat again in 2016. He won the primary uncontested but lost to Skoufis in the general election, 53% to 47%.

In 2018, after Skoufis had declared his campaign for the 39th district of the State Senate, Schmitt announced he would run for the 99th district for a third time. He defeated Democrat Matthew Rettig with 53% of the vote, and was sworn into the Assembly on January 9, 2019.

In 2020, Schmitt defeated Democratic challenger Sarita Bhandarkar to hold his seat. He was widely criticized for underhanded campaign tactics, with the Times Herald Record characterizing his attack website as "vile" and calling on voters to ignore his "nasty" attacks.

Over the course of his four years in the NY Assembly, only six of Schmitt 's prime sponsored bills became law. Three of those laws established or renewed hotel taxes in municipalities in his district. Two laws recharacterized local creeks as "inland waterways" and the sixth law permitted a town in the district to convert land that formerly was part of a park into permanent golf course use. Several of his bills that did not become law were more controversial, including an attempted ban on Critical Race Theory and classroom lessons that made students feel discomfort about racism, and a prohibition on mask guidance or mandates from New York state.

January 6 Controversy 
Schmitt delivered send-off remarks to two busloads of Donald Trump supporters as they headed to the Capitol on January 6th, 2021 to protest the election of President Joe Biden. The disclosure of this news resulted in immediate calls for Schmitt's resignation, which he resisted. However, his decision to engage with the protesters and later defend their actions resulted in ongoing, unresolved controversy that became a central theme in his run for Congress in 2022.

2022 congressional election 

Following the 2020 election, Schmitt announced his candidacy for New York's 18th congressional district in the 2022 election. Schmitt was defeated in the general election by incumbent Democrat Pat Ryan in a close race.

Personal life
Schmitt lives in New Windsor, New York, with his wife, Nikki Pagano-Schmitt.

References

1990 births
21st-century American politicians
Candidates in the 2022 United States House of Representatives elections
Catholic University of America alumni
Living people
Republican Party members of the New York State Assembly
New York National Guard personnel
People from New Windsor, New York
Politicians from Staten Island
United States Army non-commissioned officers